Cliniodes mellalis is a moth in the family Crambidae. It was described by James E. Hayden in 2011. It is found in Costa Rica.

Adults have been recorded on wing in February, April and from August to November.

Etymology
The species name refers to the dark yellow forewings and is derived from Latin mel (meaning honey).

References

Moths described in 2011
Eurrhypini